Calgary-South East  (previously styled Calgary South East) is a provincial electoral district in Calgary, Alberta. It has existed twice, first from 1959 to 1963, and then re-created in 2010. The district is mandated to return a single member to the Legislative Assembly of Alberta.

The current electoral district was created from a portion of Airdrie-Chestermere, Calgary-Hays and Calgary-Shaw. It contains the neighbourhoods of Auburn Bay, Cranston, Mahogany & Seton.

History
The first provincial electoral district to use the name Calgary South East was created in the 1959 redistribution that saw the provincial ridings of Calgary and Edmonton broken up. This marked the transition to standardize elections back to the First Past the Post across the province. From 1926 to 1959 Calgary and Edmonton, elected members with Single Transferable Vote in super districts while rest of the province used single member riding's using an Alternate voting method with a 50% margin.

The district was quickly abolished in the 1963 boundary redistribution when it became part of the Calgary South electoral district.

A new electoral district was created in southeast Calgary in the 2010 boundary redistribution. The roots of the new district can be traced back to the old South East district through various changes to the electoral boundaries that have taken place since. The district was created primarily from Calgary-Hays and Calgary-Shaw and its boundaries were expanded into areas of the old Airdrie-Chestermere and Highwood electoral districts where the city of Calgary boundaries had expanded.

Boundary history

Electoral history
The first incarnation of Calgary South East saw Social Credit MLA Art Dixon win his third term in office with a landslide majority. He defeated two city of Calgary alderman to keep his seat in the Assembly. Dixon won the new district of Calgary South after South East was abolished in 1963.

Recently the area that comprises the new Calgary-South East has returned Progressive Conservative candidates with large majorities and has done so since the 1970s. The incumbent for Calgary-Hays during the 2010 boundary shift was Art Johnston. He tried to run for renomination but was defeated by Progressive Conservative candidate Rick Fraser and won't stand for re-election.

Shortly after the Progressive Conservatives merged with Wildrose in 2017, Fraser announced he would sit as an independent. In January 2018 he announced he would run for the leadership of the Alberta Party, but has yet to inform the Speaker whether he intends to join the party caucus.

Legislature results 1959-1963

1959 general election

Legislature results 2012-present

2012 general election

2015 general election

2019 general election

Senate nominee results

2012 Senate nominee election district results

Student vote results

2012 election

References

External links
The Legislative Assembly of Alberta

Alberta provincial electoral districts
Politics of Calgary